Bloomington High School North (often referred to as BHSN or simply North) opened in the fall of 1972, is a comprehensive four-year public high school located in the northern part of Bloomington, Indiana, United States. The school is accredited by the Indiana State Department of Public Instruction and the North Central Association of Colleges and Schools.

Athletics 
The Cougars compete in the Conference Indiana, with their main rival being the cross-town Bloomington High School South Panthers. They have won a total of 3 IHSAA Championships.

Notable alumni

Joshua Bell – Professional violinist
Daniel Biss – Illinois House of Representatives member from the 9th district
Jonathan Biss – Professional Pianist
Kueth Duany – Former professional basketball player, most recently playing for the Buffalo Silverbacks of the ABA. Duany also played for several other professional teams including the Fayetteville Patriots of the NBA Development League, Braunschweig and Telekom Baskets Bonnof the German Basketball Bundesliga and the Tampereen Pyrintö of the Finnish Korisliiga.
Jared Jeffries – Former NBA player for the Washington Wizards, New York Knicks, Houston Rockets and Portland Trail Blazers
Djibril Kante - Former professional basketball player (Europe, South America); led Indiana State to 2x NCAA tournaments.
Pat Knight – Current scout for the Indiana Pacers. Former head coach of the Lamar Cardinals men's basketball team (2011–2014), the Texas Tech Red Raiders basketball team (2008–2011), the Columbus Cagerz of the United States Basketball League (1998) and the Wisconsin Blast of the International Basketball Association. Knight is the son of Basketball Hall of Fame member and long time Indiana Hoosiers men's basketball head coach Bob Knight
Michael Koryta – New York Times best-selling and award-winning suspense novelist
Sean May – Current assistant to the director of player development for the North Carolina Tar Heels men's basketball team. May previously played for the Charlotte Hornets and Sacramento Kings of the NBA. May also played for several other professional teams including the Fenerbahçe Ülker of the Turkish Basketball Federation, the KK Zagreb of the Euroleague, the Sutor Basket jMontegranaro formerly of the Italian Lega Basket Serie A, as well the Paris-Levallois Basket, SPO Rouen Basket and Orléans Loiret Basket of the French Ligue Nationale de Basket.
Terry Stotts – Former head coach of the NBA's Atlanta Hawks (2002–2004), Milwaukee Bucks (2005–2007) and Portland Trail Blazers (2012-2021).
Mario Wuysang – Professional basketball player for the CLS Knights Surabaya of the Indonesian IBL.

See also
 List of high schools in Indiana

References

External links 

Public high schools in Indiana
Educational institutions established in 1972
Schools in Monroe County, Indiana
Buildings and structures in Bloomington, Indiana
1972 establishments in Indiana